John William Harbaugh (born September 23, 1962) is an American football coach who is the head coach for the Baltimore Ravens of the National Football League (NFL). Previously, he coached the defensive backs for the Philadelphia Eagles and served as the Eagles special teams coach for nine years. Harbaugh and his younger brother, former San Francisco 49ers and current University of Michigan head coach Jim Harbaugh, are the first pair of brothers in NFL history to serve as head coaches. Jack Harbaugh, Jim and John's father, served 45 years as a college defensive coach, an assistant coach, and a running backs coach.  John and the Ravens beat his brother, Jim, and the 49ers at Super Bowl XLVII in New Orleans on February 3, 2013 by a score of 34–31. 

Harbaugh has led the Ravens to 158 wins (including playoffs) since his tenure began in 2008, the fourth-most wins in the NFL over that span, and has surpassed Brian Billick for the most wins by a head coach in Baltimore Ravens franchise history. In his fifteen-year tenure as Ravens head coach, Harbaugh has led the Ravens to eleven winning seasons and only two losing seasons. His 19 playoff game appearances are the second-most by any head coach in the NFL since 2008. Harbaugh is the only head coach in NFL history (since 1970 merger) to win a playoff game in each of his first four and five seasons. He is also the only head coach in NFL history to win a playoff game six of the first seven seasons of a coaching career and has the most road playoff wins by a head coach (8). Outside of winning Super Bowl XLVII, Harbaugh has guided the Ravens to four AFC North division championships, three AFC Championship appearances and a franchise-best 14–2 record in 2019.

Early life

John Harbaugh was born in Toledo, Ohio, to Jackie Cipiti and Jack Harbaugh. John Harbaugh graduated from Pioneer High School in Ann Arbor, Michigan, during which time his father Jack was an assistant under Bo Schembechler at the nearby University of Michigan.

Harbaugh attended college and played varsity football as a defensive back at Miami University, where he graduated in 1984.

Coaching career

College

Harbaugh worked as an assistant at Western Michigan (1984–1987), Pitt (1987), Morehead State (1988), Cincinnati (1989–1996), and Indiana (1997).

Philadelphia Eagles assistant
He was first hired in the NFL in 1998 by the Philadelphia Eagles' then head coach Ray Rhodes, and was one of four assistant coaches retained by new head coach Andy Reid in 1999.  As such, he is in the Sid Gillman coaching tree. In 2004, he was mentioned as a possible candidate to replace Gary Darnell as the head football coach at Western Michigan, where he had earned a master's degree and was an assistant football coach from 1984–1987.

In 2007, after serving as Eagles' special-teams coach for nine years, he became their defensive-backs coach. This fulfilled his request to head coach Reid and improved his chances of landing a head coaching job since executives at that time viewed special teams coaches as unqualified to move up to head coach.

Baltimore Ravens head coach
On January 19, 2008, Harbaugh was appointed the third-ever head coach of the Baltimore Ravens after Jason Garrett, the team's first choice, decided to stay with the Dallas Cowboys after receiving a raise and a promotion to assistant head coach. He was not considered one of the favorites for the position because he had no head coaching experience at any level and had never been an offensive or defensive coordinator in the NFL. He impressed team owner Steve Bisciotti and Vice President of Player Personnel/General Manager Ozzie Newsome. New England Patriots head coach Bill Belichick also recommended Harbaugh to Bisciotti by phone during the interview process.

On January 23, 2008, Harbaugh hired longtime NFL offensive coach (and former head coach) Cam Cameron as offensive coordinator. (Cameron had previously hired Harbaugh as an assistant at Indiana.) Cameron was also quarterbacks coach for John's brother, Jim, during their time at Michigan. On September 7, 2008, in his debut as a head coach, John and his Ravens beat the Cincinnati Bengals 17–10.

In his first season as a head coach, Harbaugh guided the Ravens to an 11–5 regular season record, good enough to qualify them for the playoffs as a wild card team. In the playoffs, he led the team to upset victories over the Miami Dolphins and Tennessee Titans before losing to the Pittsburgh Steelers in the AFC Championship Game.

On January 26, 2009, he named Greg Mattison the defensive coordinator for the Ravens, replacing Rex Ryan who had left to take his first head coaching job (with the New York Jets). Mattison had served as linebacker coach and defensive coordinator for Harbaugh's father, Jack, at Western Michigan University from 1981–86, when Harbaugh was a graduate assistant and assistant coach for his father.

In his second season as Ravens' head coach, he once again led the team to the playoffs with a 9–7 record during the regular season and improved his playoff record to 3–1 with an upset victory over the New England Patriots in the AFC wild card round on January 10, 2010 before losing in the AFC divisional game to the Indianapolis Colts. He once again took the Ravens to the playoffs in 2010, beating the Kansas City Chiefs in the wild card round on January 9, 2011, before losing to the Pittsburgh Steelers in the divisional round 31–24 on January 15 after starting the second half with a 14-point lead.

Harbaugh signed a three-year extension on February 14, 2011 that kept him under contract through 2014. The Ravens finished 2011 12–4, winning the AFC North division and sweeping the Steelers home and away before losing the AFC Championship Game to the New England Patriots after Lee Evans had a potential late game-winning pass knocked out of his hands by Patriots defensive back Sterling Moore and kicker Billy Cundiff flubbed a potential game-tying field goal. Neither Evans nor Cundiff made the 53-man 2012 roster.

John faced his younger brother Jim in Week 12 (2011) on Thanksgiving Day when John's Ravens beat Jim's San Francisco 49ers 16–6.

The 2012 Baltimore Ravens again met the Patriots in the AFC championship game (on January 20, 2013), got their revenge with a 28–13 victory (coming from behind with a 13–7 second half), and was the first time Tom Brady and Bill Belichick lost a home game after leading at halftime, giving John the opportunity to face brother Jim and the 49ers in Super Bowl XLVII on February 3, 2013. Many have pegged Super Bowl XLVII as the "Harbowl". The Ravens were victorious, defeating the 49ers 34–31. Following the victory, John gave his entire staff replica Lombardi trophies to commemorate the victory.

In 2012, Harbaugh was awarded the third-highest honor within the Department of the Army Civilian Awards, the Outstanding Civilian Service Award, for substantial contributions to the U.S. Army community while serving as the Baltimore Ravens Coach.

He was selected to be inducted into Miami University's "Cradle of Coaches" in 2013.

On September 5, 2013, an hour before the Ravens played in the NFL regular season's opening game, it was reported that Harbaugh had signed a four-year contract extension in a deal that was reached "months ago."

Harbaugh is the only head coach in NFL history to win a playoff game in each of his first five seasons, according to NFL Network.

In each of Harbaugh's first four seasons and again in 2014, every AFC Champion defeated the Ravens in the playoffs (although only the 2008 Pittsburgh Steelers and 2014 New England Patriots were able to actually win the Super Bowl).

In the 2014 AFC Wild Card round of the NFL playoffs, Harbaugh's Ravens beat the Pittsburgh Steelers in Heinz Field in a dominant 30–17 victory, which was the Ravens' first playoff victory against the Steelers in the history of the franchise. However, the next week, the Ravens lost 31–35 in the AFC Divisional round to the New England Patriots after the Ravens were unable to hold two separate 14-point leads. After the game, Harbaugh complained about the Patriots' uncommon but legal tactics of declaring receivers eligible and ineligible, saying "It was clearly deception."

In 2015, Harbaugh had his first losing season with the Ravens.  The Ravens lost many close games and key players like Joe Flacco, Justin Forsett, Steve Smith Sr., Eugene Monroe, and Terrell Suggs all suffered season-ending injuries.  They finished third in the AFC North with a 5–11 record.

On August 28, 2017, Harbaugh signed a one-year contract extension, keeping him under contract through the 2019 season.

On January 24, 2019, Harbaugh signed a four year contract extension, keeping him under contract through the 2022 season.

During the season, Harbaugh led the Ravens to a 14–2 record in the regular season and secured the number 1 seed in the AFC playoffs.  In the divisional playoff game against the Tennessee Titans, the Ravens lost the game 28–12. For his work during the 2019 season, Harbaugh was honored as the AP NFL Coach of the Year.

In 2020, Harbaugh led the Ravens to a second-place in the AFC North with a record of 11-5, a wild card berth as the #5 seed, and their first playoff win since the 2014 season in a Wild Card win over the Tennessee Titans.  The win not only helped the Ravens avenge their embarrassing playoff loss the year prior and brought reigning MVP Lamar Jackson to his first postseason win, it also broke the NFL record for most road playoff games won. In the Divisional Round, the Ravens fell to the Buffalo Bills 17–3.

In 2021, Harbaugh led the Ravens to a 8-3 start, and having the number 1 seed by Week 12. However due to injuries and defensive struggles, the Ravens suffered a late-season collapse, falling to a six game losing streak to end the season, finishing 8-9 and failing to qualify for playoff contention on the final week of the season to the Pittsburgh Steelers. It was the first time since 2015 that the Ravens suffered a losing season under Harbaugh, and the first time they finished in 4th place in the AFC North since 2007. Harbaugh also came under scrutiny where he called a two-point conversion late in the fourth quarter twice to put the Ravens up by one, which both failed. Once against the Steelers in Week 13, and the other against the Packers.

On March 29, 2022, Harbaugh signed a three-year extension with the Ravens that runs through the 2025 season.

Head coaching record
Accurate through the end of the 2022 NFL season

Personal life
Harbaugh is a Roman Catholic.
He is married to Ingrid Harbaugh, and they have one daughter, Allison.

Harbaugh's younger brother, Jim, a former NFL quarterback and head coach, has been the head football coach of the Michigan Wolverines since 2015. Their father, Jack, is a former head football coach at Western Michigan University and Western Kentucky University. John's sister, Joani, is married to Tom Crean, the former head men's basketball coach at Indiana University and the University of Georgia. John was roommates with the late Brian Pillman of WCW, ECW, and WWE fame while in college at Miami of Ohio.

References

External links

 Baltimore Ravens bio
 Coaching statistics at Pro-Football-Reference.com

1962 births
American football defensive backs
American people of German descent
American people of Irish descent
American people of Polish descent
American people of Italian descent
Baltimore Ravens head coaches
Catholics from Michigan
Catholics from Ohio
Cincinnati Bearcats football coaches
Coaches of American football from Michigan
Harbaugh family
Indiana Hoosiers football coaches
Living people
Miami RedHawks football coaches
Miami RedHawks football players
Morehead State Eagles football coaches
Philadelphia Eagles coaches
Pittsburgh Panthers football coaches
Players of American football from Ann Arbor, Michigan
Sportspeople from Toledo, Ohio
Super Bowl-winning head coaches
Western Michigan Broncos football coaches